Frits Clausen (12 November 1893 – 5 December 1947) was leader of the National Socialist Workers' Party of Denmark (DNSAP) prior to and during World War II.

Life
Born in Aabenraa, since 1864 a part of Prussia, Clausen served in the German Army during World War I. After the war, Clausen studied medicine in Heidelberg and became a doctor in 1924, after which he returned to Aabenraa, which had been voted back to Denmark in 1920, and set up a practice. Clausen initially became involved in politics as an advocate of Aabenraa once again becoming a part of Germany, but he eventually turned to Danish politics, advocating causes that favored the German minority in southern Jutland.

Clausen at first became a member of the conservative party, but he eventually resigned from the party and in 1931 joined the DNSAP. Two years later, Clausen ousted the leadership committee of the party (whose members were Einar Jørgensen, C. C. Hansen, and Cay Lembcke) from power and became the party's sole leader.

Under Clausen's direction, the party essentially espoused nationalism and called for a stronger relationship between Denmark and Nazi Germany. At the height of its popularity, the DNSAP had about 20,000 members and 20,000 sympathizers. However, the party fared relatively poorly in the 1939 elections, winning only three seats in the Folketing. A year later, when Germany invaded Denmark, Clausen became a strong supporter of the German occupation and took credit for the lenient way in which Germany governed the country.

The Germans attempted to reward Clausen for his services by trying to persuade King Christian X to let Clausen and his followers have roles in the nation's government in 1940 and 1943, but the King opposed any such suggestions. The German government was unwilling to forcibly put him in charge of Denmark for fear of angering its people, although there were talks of doing so in 1940 and 1942. The Germans did hope, however, that Clausen would legally seize power over the nation in the 1943 elections, but the DNSAP performed just as poorly in the elections as it did in 1939, once again winning only three seats in the Folketing.

After the elections, Clausen joined the German Army and saw active service on the Eastern Front as a surgeon, although he did not resign his position as chief of the DNSAP. Clausen returned to Denmark in the spring of 1944, after which time his political career was terminated.

Clausen's failure in the elections and his unwillingness to actively assist in forming a Danish branch of the Schutzstaffel alienated his German supporters, and as such SS Obergruppenführer Dr. Werner Best, the Plenipotentiary of the German Reich for Denmark, convinced Clausen to step down as leader of the party and replaced him with a three-man committee shortly after his return to Denmark.

After Germany's occupation of Denmark ended in May 1945, Clausen was captured and sent to  Frøslev Prison Camp. He was later given a formal trial, but he died of a heart attack in the Vestre Fængsel, a prison in Copenhagen, before it could be completed.

Sources 
 Ole Ravn, Fører uden folk : Frits Clausen og Danmarks National Socialistiske Arbejder-Parti, University of Southern Denmark, 2007. . (in Danish).
 John T. Lauridsen (ed.), "Føreren har ordet!" : Frits Clausen om sig selv og DNSAP, Museum Tusculanum, 2003. . (in Danish).

External links
 

1893 births
1947 deaths
People from Aabenraa Municipality
German Army personnel of World War I
National Socialist Workers' Party of Denmark politicians
Members of the Folketing
Danish anti-communists
Danish collaborators with Nazi Germany
Danish Nazis
Danish people of World War II
Danish people who died in prison custody
Prisoners who died in Danish detention
Waffen-SS personnel
Leaders of political parties in Denmark